Common name: Tancitaran dusky rattlesnake

Crotalus pusillus is a venomous pit viper species found in west-central Mexico. No subspecies are currently recognized.

Description 
Females are smaller.

Behavior 
Campbell and Lamar (2004) found this species only to be active during the day. Within its range, night temperatures are low and apparently restrict its activity.

Geographic range 
It is found in west-central Mexico in the Sierra de Coalcomán of southwestern Michoacán, the Transverse Volcanic Cordillera of west-central Michoacán, and in adjacent Jalisco. It is probably also found in northeastern Colima. The type locality given is "Tancítaro, Michoacán, Mexico, altitude 5,000 ft" (5,000 ft = 1,524 m).

Conservation status 
This species is classified as Endangered on the IUCN Red List of Threatened Species with the following criteria: B1ab(iii) (v3.1, 2001). A species is listed as such when the best available evidence indicates its extent of occurrence is estimated to be less than 5000 km2, estimates indicate its range is severely fragmented or known to exist at no more than five locations, and a continuing decline has been observed, inferred, or projected in the area, extent, and/or quality of its habitat. Therefore, it is considered to be facing a very high risk of extinction in the wild. The population trend was unknown when assessed in 2007.

References

Further reading 
 Klauber, L.M. 1952. Taxonomic studies on rattlesnakes of Mainland Mexico. Bull. Zool. Soc. San Diego 26:1-143.

External links 
 

pusillus
Reptiles described in 1952